Usoni Club de Mutsamudu, better known as simply Usoni, is a Comorian basketball club based in Mutsamudu. The club's colors are blue and white.

In 2019, the team competed in the  inaugural qualifiers for the Basketball Africa League.  The team had a 0–4 record while Soula El Had led the team in scoring.

Honours 
Comoros National Champions

 Champions: 2016, 2017

References

External links
Official Facebook

Basketball teams in the Comoros
Road to BAL teams